Narcís Casanoves or Narciso Casanovas (1747–1799) was a Spanish composer who became a Benedictine monk in 1763 at Montserrat, where he remained for the rest of his life.  As well as sacred music, he wrote single-movement sonatas for the keyboard.

References

External links
 

Composers from Catalonia
1747 births
1799 deaths
Spanish Benedictines
Spanish classical composers
Spanish male classical composers
18th-century classical composers
18th-century male musicians
18th-century musicians